Oliver Castle was a medieval tower house, located in the upper Tweed Valley in the Scottish Borders. The site of the hillfort known as Oliver Castle is to the north of the village of Tweedsmuir, although the site of the tower house is less certain. Mentioned in a document of c.1200, it was originally part of the line of peel towers along the Tweed Valley. It was replaced in the seventeenth century by a house, which was itself replaced in the late 18th century by the present Oliver House. For most of its existence the property has been owned by members of the Tweedie family.

History
The castle was originally associated with Clan Fraser, and was perhaps named for Oliver Fraser, who gave lands to Newbattle Abbey as recorded in its register. The lines of descent from Oliver and his nephew Adam are uncertain, but the Frasers continued to exert power from Oliver Castle with Sir Bernard Fraser and Sir Gilbert Fraser, who held in turn the hereditary office of Sheriff of Tweeddale. A descendant, Sir Simon Fraser of Oliver and Neidpath, Knight Banneret, fought in the Wars of Scottish Independence.

Oliver passed to the Tweedies through a marriage to Sir Simon Fraser's daughter or granddaughter, by which they also gained Drumelzier. The legendary lawlessness of the Scottish Marches revolved around bitter inter-family feuds and conflict over livestock. In an incident characteristic of the times, Thomas Porteus of nearby Hawkshaw was arraigned on 16 February 1489 for having lifted seventy-four lambs from the lands of Oliver Castle, belonging to William Tweedie and Lawrence Tweedie.

In the 17th or 18th century a new house was built by the Tweedies, which was itself replaced by the present Oliver House, which was begun in about 1780 by Thomas Tweedie of Oliver. Both houses are likely to have reused stone from the medieval tower house.

Situation and remains
The site of the prehistoric hillfort is protected as a scheduled monument. The two lines of defence are visible as little more than grassy banks. Inside, possible timber house sites have been noted as well as later stone foundations. The association of these remains with the medieval castle has not been confirmed by excavation, though tradition places the castle on the hillfort site.

The old house is a typical laird's residence, although much altered. It bears the date 1734, with the initials of James Tweedie of Oliver and his wife Margeret Ewart. An older date of 1649 is also recorded as being inscribed on the old house.

References

See also
List of places in the Scottish Borders
List of places in Scotland

Peel towers in the Scottish Borders
Castles in the Scottish Borders
Former castles in Scotland